Alan Joel Greiman (December 29, 1931 – February 14, 2022) was an American judge and politician.

Born in Chicago, Illinois, Greiman received his bachelor's and law degrees from University of Illinois. He was admitted to the Illinois bar in 1955 and practiced law in Skokie, Illinois. Greiman served in the Illinois House of Representatives from 1972 to 1987 and was a Democrat. In 1987, Greiman was appointed to the Illinois Circuit Court for Cook County, Illinois. In 1991, Greiman was appointed to the Illinois Appellate Court. Greiman died on February 14, 2022, at the age of 90.

Notes

1931 births
2022 deaths
Politicians from Chicago
People from Skokie, Illinois
University of Illinois alumni
Judges of the Illinois Appellate Court
Democratic Party members of the Illinois House of Representatives
20th-century American politicians
20th-century American judges